Gabriel Monteiro Vasconcelos (born 15 March 1996) is a Brazilian professional footballer who plays as a forward.

Club career

Corinthians
Born in Porto Velho, Vasconcelos joined the youth setup of Fluminense at the age of 12. In May 2014, he switched to the Corinthians academy. While playing with the under-20 team, he emerged as the top scorer of 2015 Copa São Paulo de Futebol Júnior, Campeonato Paulista besides winning the under-20 edition of 2014 Série A. In January 2016, he was promoted to the first team and signed a contract until September 2017.

America-RJ
Deemed surplus to the club's requirements, Vasconcelos was loaned to America-RJ on 18 February 2016 in order to get more first team opportunities. In March, he scored a brace (his first goals in professional football) in a 2–1 victory against Cabofriense.

Joinville
On 3 June 2016, he was loaned to Joinville for their Série B campaign. However, after the appointment of Lisca as the club's manager, he was rarely used. Subsequently, he was recalled from loan by Corinthians in August.

Oeste
On 30 May 2017, Vasconcelos was loaned to Oeste of the same tier for the whole season. An undisputed starter, he played both as a false 9 and as a winger during his stint at the club. He contributed with three goals in 30 matches, which included a brace against Paraná.

Later loans
On 12 January 2018, Vasconcelos joined Ponte Preta on a season long loan deal after renewing his contract with parent club until 2019. After struggling to get playing time, he left the club on 26 July. On the following day, he moved to São Bento on a temporary deal.

York9
On January 21, 2020, Vasconcelos signed with Canadian Premier League side York9. He made his debut for the Nine Stripes on August 15 against Atlético Ottawa. After that season, his contract option was turned down after making two appearances for the club.

Sampaio Corrêa
On 18 February 2021, Vasconcelos returned to Brazil, signing with Série B side Sampaio Corrêa.

Career statistics

References

External links

1996 births
Living people
Association football forwards
Brazilian footballers
People from Porto Velho
Brazilian expatriate footballers
Expatriate soccer players in Canada
Brazilian expatriate sportspeople in Canada
Fluminense FC players
Sport Club Corinthians Paulista players
America Football Club (RJ) players
Joinville Esporte Clube players
Oeste Futebol Clube players
Associação Atlética Ponte Preta players
Esporte Clube São Bento players
York United FC players
Sampaio Corrêa Futebol Clube players
Campeonato Brasileiro Série B players
Canadian Premier League players
Sportspeople from Rondônia